Yarleen Santiago Pagán (born January 18, 1978 in Arecibo, Puerto Rico) is a female beach volleyball player who won the gold medal at the NORCECA Circuit 2009 at Montelimar, Nicaragua playing with Dariam Acevedo.

At home, she was runner-up of the beach professional circuit Circuito de Voleibol Playero Profesional, playing with Sheila Conley. In 2009, playing with Dariam Acevedo, she won the championship.

College
She studied and played at the University of Arkansas as an outside hitter. There, between 1997–1999, she earned AVCA All District/All region, All Southeastern Conference (SEC) Team and SEC All-Tournament Team honors every year. She also led her team in digs every season between 1997–1999. She earned the Freshman of the Year Award in 1997.

Indoor
She retired from the Puerto Rico National Team in 2007 after having represented her home country in many events. At the 2006 Women's Pan-American Volleyball Cup, she won the Best Defense Award.

She also played professionally in 2009 with Gigantes de Carolina from Liga de Voleibol Superior Femenino.

Clubs
  Ganaderas de Hatillo (1994)
  Marche Metalli Castelfidardo (2004–2005)
  Gigantes de Carolina (2006)
  Criollas de Caguas (2007–2008)
  Gigantes de Carolina (2009)

Awards

Individuals
 2009 Liga de Voleibol Superior Femenino "All-Star"
 2006 Pan-American Cup "Best Defender"

College
 1999 SEC Player of the Week, (Week 2 and Week 10)
 1999 AVCA All-District 4/All-Region First Team
 1998 AVCA All-District 4/All-Region Second Team
 1997 AVCA All-District 4/All-Region First Team
 1999 All Southeastern Conference First Team
 1998 All Southeastern Conference Second Team
 1997 All Southeastern Conference First Team
 1997–1999 SEC All-Tournament Team
 1997 Asics/Volleyball Division I Freshman of the year

National Team
 NORCECA Beach Volleyball Circuit Nicaragua 2009  Gold Medal
 NORCECA Beach Volleyball Circuit Jamaica 2009  Silver Medal

Beach
 2008 Circuito de Voleibol Playero Profesional –  Champion
 2008 Circuito de Voleibol Playero Profesional – Runner-Up

Clubs
 Liga de Voleibol Superior Femenino 2008 –  Runner-Up, with Criollas de Caguas
 Liga de Voleibol Superior Femenino 2007 –  Runner-Up, with Criollas de Caguas
 Liga de Voleibol Superior Femenino 2006 –  Champion, with Gigantes de Carolina

References

External links
 
 
 Italian League Profile

Living people
1978 births
Beach volleyball players at the 2011 Pan American Games
Expatriate volleyball players in the United States
Arkansas Razorbacks women's volleyball players
Pan American Games bronze medalists for Puerto Rico
Pan American Games medalists in volleyball
People from Arecibo, Puerto Rico
Puerto Rican women's beach volleyball players
Puerto Rican women's volleyball players
Medalists at the 2011 Pan American Games